Maita Station may refer to:

 Maita Station (Kanagawa) in Yokohama, Japan
 Maita Station (Nagano) in Ueda, Nagano, Japan